Loch Tilt is a small mountain freshwater loch that sits at the end of Glen Tilt and is located in north-east Perth and Kinross, Scotland. Loch Tilt has a north to south orientation. Loch Tilt is located 10 miles southwest of Braemar.

References

Tilt
Tilt
Tay catchment